Twizzlers are the product of Y&S Candies, Inc., of Lancaster, Pennsylvania. Twizzlers were first produced in 1929 by Young and Smylie, as the company was then called.  The licorice company was founded in 1845, making it one of the oldest confectionery firms in the United States.  Twizzlers ingredients consist of corn syrup, wheat flour, sugar, cornstarch, and smaller amounts of palm oil, salt, artificial flavor, glycerin, citric acid, potassium sorbate, Red 40, and soy lecithin.  Because only black Twizzlers contain extracts of the licorice plant, they are collectively referred to as licorice-type candy.  Seventy percent of the annual production of Twizzlers are strawberry, the most popular Twizzlers flavor.

Company history 
The manufacturer of Twizzlers candy is one of the oldest confectionery firms in the United States. The company was established in 1845 as Young and Smylie, and adopted Y&S as its trademark in 1870.  National Licorice Company was created in 1902 through the merger of three small firms: Young & Smylie, S.V. & F.P. Schudder and H.W. Petherbridge. In 1908 a plant was opened in Montreal and in 1929 the Twizzlers brand was created. The company changed its name to Y&S Candies Inc. in 1968.  Y&S Candies was acquired by The Hershey Company in November 1977 in a pooling-of-interests, then merged into Hershey in January 1982.

Since 1999, Twizzlers have been manufactured in Memphis, Tennessee, as well as Lancaster, in a Y&S plant that makes chewing gum and other candies. From 1970 through 1999, it was manufactured in Farmington, New Mexico, but relocated the operation to Memphis due to rising transportation costs.

Nibs history 
Nibs are bite-sized licorice pieces made for nibbling.  The confectionery industry has long used the word nibs to describe small pieces of a product.  The origin of the industry's use of the word comes from cacao nibs, which are the bitter but very flavorful chocolate bits made from the beans of the cocoa tree.  

No one knows when Y&S introduced its Nibs to the Twizzlers licorice line, whether it was in the 1930s right after Twizzlers were first produced or some time later.  Candy packaging collectors provide first-hand accounts of specific Nibs package features on specimens from the 1960s and 1970s.  Even though the company sold nearly 50 million pounds of licorice products a year by 1975, in an effort to differentiate the Twizzlers and Nibs products, in that year Y&S turned to a Madison Avenue ad firm to separately promote the different products.

Products 
While the original flavor introduced in 1845 was licorice, in the middle 1970s the company began to expand its flavors to include strawberry, grape, chocolate, cherry, and watermelon flavors. Limited edition cherry cola and "rainbow" (fruit variety consisting of strawberry, orange, lemonade, watermelon, blue raspberry and grape) flavors were introduced in 2006. Today all these flavors of "rainbow" Twizzlers are still sold in stores and movie theaters.

Twizzlers come in a variety of shapes and sizes. In addition to the original Twists, Nibs and Bites of various sizes, Y&S introduced Pull 'n' Peel in 1994. Twerpz and Strawz came along in 2004.

In 2006, Y&S introduced the Sweet and Sour Filled Twist. They come in two different colors, red and yellow, and both have a viscous, fruity filling inside.  The yellow flavor is Citrus Punch and the red flavor is Cherry Kick. In 2011, Super Long Nibs was introduced, combining the flavor and texture of the classic Nib with the length of a standard Twizzlers twist. In May 2013, the Pull 'n' Peel introduced its "Raspberry Wild Berry Lemonade" flavor.

In December 2014, Twizzlers came out with Pull 'n' Peel Fruit Punch and Twizzlers filled Strawberry Lemonade varieties.

In December 2016, Twizzlers came out with Pull 'n' Peel Cherry and Green Apple and Twizzlers filled Strawberry Lemonade varieties.

All flavors of  Pull 'n' Peel and Twists, and cherry and black licorice flavored Bites and Nibs are kosher certified by the Orthodox Union. Strawberry Twizzlers, cherry Pull 'n' Peel, Bites, Twists and Nibs, black licorice Twizzlers, and chocolate flavored Twizzlers do not contain animal gelatin or other animal products, and are approved as a vegan-edible candy.

See also
 Red Vines

References

External links

 

The Hershey Company brands
Products introduced in 1929
Companies based in Lancaster, Pennsylvania
American confectionery
Liquorice (confectionery)
Kosher food
Brand name confectionery
Candy